NPO  “Digital Television Systems” is an enterprise for various equipment and devices assembling for a wide range of purposes (from office equipment to the military and medical equipment of the highest quality). The plant utilizes full production cycle: from initial installation to complete assembly, testing and packaging of the finished products.

The Company History
 2007 – The Company was founded
 2008 – The initial design and construction stage
 2008 – Start of cooperation with Public Company “Concern “Innovative Technology” (trade mark General Satellite)
 2009 – Prize "Kaliningrad brand - 2008" (nominated for “Best Innovations”)
 2009 – The SIU Digital TV System plant started operating
 2010 – Start of partnership with Samsung Electronics

The Company was established in 2007 on the basis of the Kaliningrad special economic zone. The primary investments sum exceeded 250 million rubles.

The original concept of development has included receivers production for receiving the satellite and terrestrial TV digital broadcasts. Along with this, it was planned to build radio-electronics "on order".

The Company was actively building its production capacity and - over a couple of years - managed to make a huge leap. Already in 2010, the daily throughput of assembly lines amounted to 3,000 boards. The automated assembly performance was 25000 components per hour; handmade assembly productivity comprised 60000 components per hour.

According to Tkachenko, the President of the Association “General Satellite Corporation”, the plant can produce any type of equipment - from TV-sets to cell phones and handhelds with the GLONASS reception – provided there is an order. In this case, the customer provides the initial components for the assembly.

Russian Television Digitalization

One of the most ambitious projects that involved NGOs DTN is the digitalization of Russian television. For instance, the Company management and the Kaliningrad region administration signed an agreement in February 2010 on cooperation between the parties, which aims to “achieve by 2015 a full digital broadcasting coverage of the Kaliningrad region and two public channel packages launch.”

“The fact that there appeared the Company, and the Region management provided proper conditions for the Company’s operation and has undertaken measures to reduce the receiver price for the low-income residents of the region gave us the opportunity to include Kaliningrad in the program without increasing the federal spending plan,” - said Sergey Ivanov, who visited the Plant together with Kaliningrad Governor Georgy Boos and the Communications Minister Igor Shchyogolev.

Social significance
The Company is of great importance both for the Gusev town, and for the entire Region. First of all, new jobs have been created and are still created (even by the end of 2008 the jobs increased up to 1500). Secondly, the enterprise is involved in various social programs and regional projects. For example, the Company provides its own training program in Gusev Polytechnic College, which allows getting the next generation employees ready right out of school."

References

Companies based in Kaliningrad
Russian companies established in 2007
Electronics companies of Russia